C'Midi is an Ivorian talk show broadcast on RTI 1 created by Joseph Andjou, produced by Jeanne Dekao Faye Lou, and presented by Caroline Dasylva. Dasylva has been the host of the program since its inception in 2014.

References

External links 

 

Television talk shows
Ivorian television series
Radiodiffusion Television Ivoirienne original programming